The known history of the monarchy of Thailand begins with the founding of the Sukhothai Kingdom, inaugurated by Si Inthrathit in 1238. This was succeeded by the Ayutthaya Kingdom and the short-lived Thonburi Kingdom. The present reigning dynasty, the Chakri Dynasty, took the throne in 1782, founding the Rattanakosin Kingdom. The present-day constitutional monarchy was established in 1932. The Chakri kings are often known as Rama: the reigning monarch is King Rama X (Vajiralongkorn).

Family tree

Sukhothai Kingdom

 – Phra Ruang dynasty (1238–1368, 1368–1438)

Ayutthaya Kingdom

 – Uthong dynasty (1350–1370, 1388–1409)

 – Suphannaphum dynasty (1370–1388, 1409–1569)

 – Sukhothai dynasty (1569–1629)

 – Prasat Thong dynasty (1629–1688)

 – Ban Phlu Luang dynasty (1688–1767)

Thonburi Kingdom

 – Thonburi dynasty (1768–1782)

Rattanakosin Kingdom and Kingdom of Thailand (1782–present)

 – Chakri dynasty (1782–present)

Thailand
Thai monarchs
Dynasty genealogy